Kimberly Couts (born May 9, 1989) is a retired American tennis player.

On 20 April 2009, she reached her career-high singles ranking of world No. 259. On 12 July 2010, she achieved her best WTA doubles ranking of 157.

Kimberly played her last match before retirement at an ITF event in Florida, United States in May 2011.

ITF finals

Singles: 1 (1–0)

Doubles: 14 (6–8)

External links
 
 

1989 births
Living people
American female tennis players
Sportspeople from Bradenton, Florida
People from Princeton, New Jersey
Tennis people from Florida
Tennis people from New Jersey
21st-century American women